Mount Huxley is a mountain located on the West Coast Range in the West Coast region of Tasmania, Australia.

One of the smaller peaks in the West Coast Range, the mountain comprises a large  outcrop and rock face on its southern side above the King River Gorge just west of the Crotty Dam – parts of which are visible along the river gorge from the West Coast Wilderness Railway where it commences following the King River.

Goldfield
Between April and June 1894 there was a goldfield situated on the slopes, and a syndicate that was discovered to have salted the mine site, with three alleged proponents, Isaac Bertram Barker, William Price and Antonio Briscoe, charged with fraud. On 1 July the Crown Solicitor told a magistrate that while the mine had undoubtedly been salted, there was insufficient evidence, and the charges were withdrawn.

Location and access
The mountain is located north of the King River Gorge and Crotty Dam and north of Mount Jukes; west of the Tofft River, Thureau Hills, and Lake Burbury; south of Mount Owen and Queenstown.

A very rough track approaches the mountain from the north, and from the south Queenstown area. The southern side is sheer cliff into the King River Gorge.

Gallery

See also

 List of highest mountains of Tasmania

References

Further reading

External links 
 West Coast Range on Google Maps
 context of World Heritage Area

Huxley, Mount
Huxley, Mount
King River power development scheme